Boston has many nicknames, inspired by various historical contexts. They include:
The City on a Hill came from governor John Winthrop's goal, of the original Massachusetts Bay Colony, to create the biblical "City on a Hill." It also refers to the original three hills of Boston.
The Hub is a shortened form of a phrase recorded by writer Oliver Wendell Holmes, The Hub of the Solar System.  This has since developed into The Hub of the Universe.
The Athens of America is a title given by William Tudor, co-founder of the North American Review, for Boston's great cultural and intellectual influence. Also a nickname of Philadelphia.
The Puritan City was given in reference to the religion of the city's founders.
The Cradle of Liberty derives from Boston's role in instigating the American Revolution. Also a nickname of Philadelphia.
City of Notions was coined at least as early as 1823.
America's Walking City was given due to Boston's compact nature and high population density, which have made walking an effective and popular mode of transit in the city. Boston has the seventh-highest percentage of pedestrian commuters of any city in the United States, while neighboring Cambridge has the highest.
Beantownrefers to the regional dish of Boston baked beans. In colonial days, a favorite Boston food was beans slow-baked in molasses. 
Titletown refers to Boston's historic dominance in professional sports, specifically the Boston Celtics, who have won 17 NBA Championships, and the New England Patriots, who have won six Super Bowl Titles.
City of Champions much like Titletown—refers to Boston's history of dominance in sports, with the Boston Red Sox, Boston Celtics, Boston Bruins, and New England Patriots each having won multiple national championships.
The Olde Towne comes from the fact that Boston is one of the oldest cities in the United States. It is also used in reference to the Boston Red Sox (The Olde Towne Team).

See also

 Nicknames of New York City
 Nicknames of Philadelphia

References 

Culture of Boston
Boston